Barrie John Lynch (born 8 June 1951) is an English former professional footballer who played as a full back.

Career
Born in Northfield, Birmingham, Lynch played youth football for Rubery Hill School and Cross Castle, before playing professionally in England and the United States for Aston Villa, Oldham Athletic, the Atlanta Chiefs and the Portland Timbers.

References

1951 births
Living people
English footballers
English expatriate footballers
Expatriate soccer players in the United States
English expatriate sportspeople in the United States
Aston Villa F.C. players
Oldham Athletic A.F.C. players
Atlanta Chiefs players
Grimsby Town F.C. players
Scunthorpe United F.C. players
Portland Timbers (1975–1982) players
Torquay United F.C. players
English Football League players
North American Soccer League (1968–1984) players
Association football fullbacks